Caristanius guatemalella is a species of snout moth in the genus Caristanius. It was described by Émile Louis Ragonot in 1888. It is found in Guatemala.

References

Moths described in 1888
Phycitinae